Jiangxi University of Traditional Chinese Medicine, designated as a medical university in Nanchang, Jiangxi, is an institution of higher learning under the leadership of Jiangxi provincial government. According to the survey by CUCAS, Jiangxi is ranked 43rd in Chinese medical universities, 577th University in China by 4icu ranking.

Brief Introduction 
Jiangxi University of Traditional Chinese Medicine has been approved by the Ministry of Education, P.R. China as one of the public higher learning institutes eligible to recruit international students. But it is banned for international students in 2019 because it wasn't able to fulfill their duties.The school began to recruit international students of MBBS with TCM as an extra in 2004. Up to 2017, the school has accepted more than 1920 international students in all, among whom, 1250 are still studying on campus. 

Jiangxi University of Traditional Chinese Medicine School of Jiangxi University of Traditional Chinese Medicine is the longest history of the school, in 1959 the establishment of Jiangxi College of traditional Chinese medicine and the establishment of Department of Chinese medicine, in 2002 and was founded in 1954 affiliated hospital implementation of hospital-in-one management model. Jiangxi University of Traditional Chinese Medicine, founded in 1959 and located in Nanchang, the capital city of Jiangxi province, China, is a higher learning institute with focus on Chinese Medicine and related disciplines. The university now has four campuses, which cover a total area of 2308 Chinese Mu (about 154 hectares) with a building area of 490,000 sq meters. The school library is home to 745,000 copies (hardcopy) of books, over 350,000 electronic books and 13 electronic resource databases. There are currently 120,000 full-time students enrolled for different disciplines and academic levels. Jiangxi University of Traditional Chinese Medicine offers courses and programs leading to officially recognized higher education degrees such as bachelor's degrees in several areas of study. International applicants are eligible to apply for enrollment. The university also provides several academic and non-academic facilities and services to students including a library, housing, as well as administrative services.

Campuses 
The university has two campuses.
 Wanli
 Yanming Campus

Main Courses

Subjects of foundation stage 

 Anatomy
 Physiology
 Biochemistry
 Pathology
 Pharmacology
 Community Medicine
 Microbiology
 Forensic Medicine and Toxicology
 Chinese
 Introduction of China

Subjects of clinical stage 

 Medicine 
 Surgery
 Obstetrics and Gynecology

 Chinese
 Pediatrics
 Orthopedics 
 Psychiatry
 Anesthesiology
 Ophthalmology
 Otorhinolaryngology
 Radiology
 Dermatology
 Medical Chinese
 Emergency medicine

Teaching Staff 
Hospital personnel strength. There are more than 1,400 employees (not including the Eastern Hospital), with more than 258 professional titles and above.

Hospital medical conditions are advanced. More than 1,600 hospital beds. June 2014, construction area of nearly 50,000 square meters of 26-story new medical complex was officially put into use, the new medical complex has a hundred, 1000, 10,000 laminar flow operation room 12. Outpatient medical space has doubled. The hospital purchased the province's first gem energy spectrum CT, with 3.0T and 1.5T nuclear magnetic resonance, DR, color Doppler and a large number of advanced ultrasound treatment equipment. To improve hospital efficiency, the hospital invested more than 2000 million, the construction of digital hospitals. The hospital achieved a wireless network full coverage.

Affiliated Hospitals 

1st Affiliated Hospital  第一附属医院
2nd Affiliated Hospital  第二附属医院
The Jiangxi Hospital of Heat-Sensitive Moxibustion
Source:

1st Affiliated Hospital 
In the 60 years since its foundation, the First Affiliated Hospital of Jiangxi University of TCM has become a comprehensive tertiary hospital (grade 3-A) integrating medical services with teaching, research and preventive health care and rehabilitation. It serves as the center for medical care, teaching, research and health care in Jiangxi Province. The hospital has over 1300 full-time employees, 29 wards, 1600 beds, and 56 clinical and technical departments including internal medicine, surgery, gynecology, pediatrics, etc. Besides, the hospital also has some characteristic departments such as Guo Yitang (a workshop for doctors of TCM), the hospital of heat-sensitive moxibustion and a department of special therapy on TCM.

Among all the employees, there are 253 with senior titles, including 12 who enjoy the special allowance of the State Council, 56 renowned doctors of TCM of the province, 12 doctoral supervisors, 112 master tutors, 4 renowned teachers of the province and 11 key teachers of the province. Now it has become a team of well- trained professionals with proper academic background and educational background, and have rich experience in clinical diagnosis&treatment and in clinical research.

The hospital is a home to 7 national key clinical disciplines, 12 key clinical disciplines of the State Administration of TCM, 8 key disciplines of the State Administration of TCM, 13 provincial key disciplines and 2 provincial top disciplines.

2nd Affiliated Hospital 
Located in the east of Nanchang, the 2nd Affiliated Hospital of Jiangxi University of TCM originated from the Hospital of Nanchang Steel Co., Ltd. (1958). It was renamed in May, 2010. Now it has become a grade 2-A hospital integrating medical services with teaching, research, preventive health care and community health care.

With 270 employees, the hospital approximately takes care of 100,000 outpatients annually. In recent years, in order to get a team of young and well-trained professionals, over 40 new professionals were introduced to the hospital, and most of them have master's degrees.

The hospital has more than 20 clinical departments (emergency room, the department of cardiovasology, neurology, respiratory medicine, gastroenterology, nephrology, general surgery, orthopedics and traumatology, anorectum, neck shoulder and lumbocrural pain (NSLP), gynecology and obstetrics, pediatrics, acupuncture and rehabilitation, and ophthalmology and otorhinolaryngology, Guo Yitang, etc.) and a community health care center. Now the hospital is equipped with SCT, DR, 4D color ultrasonic, hemodialysis machine, TCT and the chromosome image analysis system. And it promotes its characteristic diagnosis and treatment of TCM on orthopedic and traumatology, acupuncture and rehabilitation, anorectal diseases and NSLP. Besides, it also builds up a new department of gynecology and obstetrics based on integrated western and traditional Chinese medicine. All in all, the hospital has been trying the best to become a public-satisfying hospital by offering qualified medical services and community health consultation to the public.

Clinical College of Medicine

Professional name: Medicine

Categories of applicants: Science and Arts

Faculty and Degree conferred: 5-year Bachelor of Medicine and Bachelor of Surgery (MBBS)

Training objectives: the professional training with good humanities, science and professionalism, the basic theory of traditional Chinese medicine system, basic knowledge, basic skills and the ability to conduct clinical medicine common disease diagnosis and treatment, a strong cultural heritage of Chinese medicine, with a strong Chinese medicine thinking ability, heritage and innovative spirit, in the field of medical and health care, prevention, health care, rehabilitation and other aspects of the work of Chinese medicine applied talents.

Training requirements: The students mainly study the basic theory of medicine, basic knowledge and necessary basic medicine, clinical medicine basic knowledge, basic training humanities, science, education and professionalism of clinical skills, master the use of Chinese medicine for diagnosis, prevention, Rehabilitation and population health services and other aspects of the basic ability.

Main courses: Basic Theory of TCM, Collation, TCM, pharmacy, prescriptions, Nei Jing Readings, Treatise on Readings, Golden Chamber Readings, Febrile Diseases, Anatomy, Physiology, Medical Immunology and Pathogen Biology, Pathology, pharmacology and other professional basic courses, and traditional Chinese medicine, traditional Chinese medicine surgery, traditional Chinese medicine gynecology, Chinese medicine ophthalmology, acupuncture and moxibustion, Chinese medicine pediatrics, Chinese medicine ENT science, Chinese medicine bone science, diagnostic science, internal medicine Medicine, surgery, emergency medicine, local anatomy, bone and joint imaging, Chinese medicine bone science, orthopedic surgery, traumatic first aid, Chiropractic and other direction of differentiation clinical courses.

The students can choose the direction of Chinese medicine clinical direction or the direction of differentiation of Chinese medicine according to individual wishes and interests of differentiation.

Main courses: basic theory of traditional Chinese medicine, Chinese medicine diagnostics, pharmacy, prescriptions, Nei Jing Readings, Treatise on Readings, Golden Chamber Readings, Febrile Diseases, Collation, normal human anatomy, physiology, immunology and medicine Pathogen Biology, Pathology, pharmacology and other professional basic courses, as well as diagnostic basis, integrated traditional Chinese and Western medicine, integrated traditional Chinese and Western medicine, integrated gynecology, Western medicine combined with ophthalmology, acupuncture, integrated traditional Chinese and Western medicine pediatrics, Western medicine combined with injury science, integrated Chinese and Western medicine ENT, emergency medicine and other integrated traditional Chinese and Western medicine courses.

Publications 
Journal of Jiangxi University of Traditional Chinese Medicine
Experimental Observations on the Antagonistic Effects of Coordinated Acupoints
A New Operating System Scheduling Algorithm

References

 http://www.cucas.cn/studyinchina/top/2015_China_Medical_University_Ranking_12.html
 https://www.4icu.org/reviews/12692.htm

Universities and colleges in Jiangxi